Templeman is a surname. Notable people with the surname include:

 Alfie Templeman (born 2003), English singer-songwriter, multi-instrumentalist and producer
 Chris Templeman (born 1980), Scottish footballer
 David Templeman (born 1965), Australian politician
 David Templeman (footballer), Scottish footballer
 Geoffrey Templeman (1914–1988), Vice-Chancellor of the University of Kent
 Harcourt Templeman, British screenwriter
 Miles Templeman, Director General of the Institute of Directors
 Nicholas Templeman (by 1478–1515), of Dover, Kent, was an English politician
 Shorty Templeman (1919–1962), American racecar driver
 Simon Templeman (born 1954), British voice actor
 Susan Templeman (born 1963), Australian politician
 Sydney Templeman, Baron Templeman (1920–2014), British judge
 Ted Templeman (born 1944), American record producer
 William Templeman (politician) (1842–1914), Canadian newspaper editor and politician
William Templeman (chemist) (1883-1919), English chemist, munitions expert and solicitor)
Willie Templeman, Scottish footballer